HNLMS Jan van Gelder was a  of the Royal Netherlands Navy that served in World War II.

Service history
Jan van Gelder was damaged by her own mines off Terschelling on 8 October 1939. Three men were killed, three were missing and seven were wounded. After initial repairs at Willemsoord, Den Helder, she received a new stern at Gusto, Schiedam, and was recommissioned on 17 April 1940.

During the invasion of the Netherlands by Germany in May 1940, she escorted the Dutch submarine O-13 to England. Later that month, on 29–31 May, she escorted the Dutch passenger ship Batavier II to Cherbourg, to pick up 280 Dutch troops.

Refitted and rearmed in 1940, she was assigned to serve with the British Royal Navy's 11th Minesweeping Flotilla, stationed in Milford Haven, Wales. Later in 1941 she served with the 9th Flotilla off Portland. She mainly acted as buoy ship, marking the swept channels. From October 1941, she swept acoustic mines off Harwich and the Isle of Wight. Later she was sent to Scotland and served as an escort ship with a British submarine flotilla. On 26 March 1943 she was transferred to the Royal Navy.

She was returned to the Netherlands in 1946 and was recommissioned in the Royal Netherlands Navy. She sailed for the Dutch East Indies where she served as patrol ship until 1950. After her return, she was rebuilt as boom defence vessel. Struck in 1961, she was then transferred to the Zeekadetkorps Nederland (Dutch Sea Cadets). She was assigned to the 'Jacob van Heemskerck' unit in the town of Schiedam, and moored at the same shipyard where she was launched 25 years earlier. The sea cadets removed the boilers for additional space, making the Jan van Gelder a stationary training ship ('floating clubhouse'). Because of severe leaking in the engine room, she was replaced in 1979, and scrapped.

Jan van Amstel-class minesweepers
1937 ships
World War II minesweepers of the Netherlands
Ships built by Gusto Shipyard